Francis Marion University is a public university near Florence, South Carolina. It is named in honor of American Revolutionary War Brigadier General Francis Marion.

History
The university dates back to 1957, when the University of South Carolina set up a freshman college in a basement room of the Florence County Library. A few years later, in 1961, USC-Florence was set up on land donated by the Wallace family six miles east of Florence, South Carolina. Buoyed by these successes, a group of Florence-area citizens continued to push for the establishment of a four-year university in Florence to allow better access to higher education for the people of that area. The existing USC-F was an obvious foundation for a new institution. After several years of lobbying, Governor Robert E. McNair signed into law an act creating Francis Marion College, effective July 1, 1970.  The newly created Francis Marion College initially enrolled 907 students from 23 of South Carolina's 46 counties.

In 1992, Francis Marion College achieved university status and subsequently changed its name to Francis Marion University. Today, Francis Marion has a student body of approximately 4,000. FMU draws students from across the country and around the world, but remains true to its original mission: to educate the people of the Pee Dee Region and the State of South Carolina. The student body's average in-state enrollment is 95 percent. Just more than half of FMU's students come from the Pee Dee Region.

Francis Marion is one of South Carolina's 13 public universities. Its academic departments are segmented into three schools (School of Business, School of Education, School of Health Sciences) and the College of Liberal Arts.

The Slave Houses, Gregg Plantation, located on the FMU campus, were listed on the National Register of Historic Places in 1974.

Academics

Francis Marion University offers five undergraduate degrees: Bachelor of Arts, Bachelor of Business Administration, Bachelor of General Studies, Bachelor of Science, and Bachelor of Science in Nursing. Graduate degrees include the Master of Arts in Teaching, Master of Business Administration, Master of Education, Master of Science in Applied Psychology (clinical and school psychology tracks), and Specialist in School Psychology.  All master's degree programs are accredited by their respective professional organizations. In 2017, FMU gained approval for its first doctoral program, a Doctor of Nursing Practice (DNP). The first class of DNP students enrolled in January 2018.

Francis Marion is accredited by the Commission on Colleges of the Southern Association of Colleges and Schools (SACS) to award bachelor's and master's degrees. The business programs are accredited by the Association to Advance Collegiate Schools of Business (AACSB). The teacher education programs of the university are accredited by the National Council for Accreditation of Teacher Education (NCATE) and approved by the South Carolina State Board of Education under standards developed by the National Association of State Directors of Teacher Education and Certification (NASDTEC). The baccalaureate degree nursing program is accredited by the National League for Nursing.  The chemistry program is approved by the Committee on Professional Training of the American Chemical Society. The graduate psychology program is accredited by the Masters in Psychology and Counseling Accreditation Council (MPCAC) and meets the standards of training approved by the Council of Applied Master's Programs in Psychology (CAMPP). The Master of Science in Applied Psychology Program is accredited by the Interorganizational Board for Accreditation of Master's in Psychology Programs (IBAMPP). The theater arts program is accredited by the National Association of Schools of Theatre (NAST), and the visual arts and art education programs are accredited by the National Association of Schools of Art and Design (NASAD). The university is approved by the South Carolina State Board of Education and is a member of the American Council on Education and the American Association of State Colleges and Universities.

Campus
The campus includes  of mixed pine-hardwood and bottomland forests accessed by a series of trails. The university is located on U.S. Highways 76 and 301 and is just an hour's drive from Myrtle Beach and the Grand Strand and four hours from the Blue Ridge Mountains. With a metropolitan-area population of 200,000, the city of Florence is nestled alongside Interstate 95, the main north–south corridor from the New England area to Miami, and at the eastern end of Interstate 20. The city is served by Amtrak, bus service, and a regional airport.

Academic facilities

The university's physical plant includes eleven major buildings: J. Howard Stokes Administration Building, James A. Rogers Library, Robert E. McNair Science Building, Hugh K. Leatherman Sr. Science Facility, Walter Douglas Smith University Center, Founders Hall, John K. Cauthen Educational Media Center (home of Cauthen Cafe, now serving Starbucks), Peter D. Hyman Fine Arts Center, Thomas C. Stanton Academic Computer Center, Lee Nursing Building, and the FMU Honors Center. In addition, the university constructed new student apartments on campus in 2006, known as The Villas.  Francis Marion is also home to a two-story observatory, equipped with a  reflecting telescope, and a planetarium that offers public shows twice monthly.

The university has an excellent writing center available for student and FMU community use throughout the school year; the center provides online and face-to-face assistance for students working on writing assignments for any class. In addition, the FMU English Department offers majors in liberal arts, education, and professional writing tracks as well as hosts a Fiction and Poetry Festival each fall.

Francis Marion also has the Richardson Center for the Child, a child-care facility for faculty, staff, and students.

Completed in Summer 2011, the FMU Performing Arts Center is located in downtown Florence.  It provides performance venues for the region featuring national, regional, and local performing artists.  Additionally, the Performing Arts Center provides instructional facilities, practice rooms, and faculty offices for the Music Industry Program offered by the FMU Department of Fine Arts.

The Griffin Athletic Complex, located near the main FMU campus, opened in 2012.  The complex includes new baseball, softball, and soccer stadiums, a fieldhouse, and a five-acre lake.

Faculty
-12, FMU has a total of 262 professors. 198 of those professors are full-time. All faculty members have advanced degrees, and 79 percent of the full-time faculty hold doctoral or terminal degrees. The average class size is 21 students. All students are assigned a faculty adviser (in their curriculum) to assist them with class scheduling and academic planning.

Athletics

The Francis Marion athletics program is a member of the NCAA Division II Conference Carolinas (CC), which consists of 13 member schools in Georgia, North Carolina, South Carolina, and Tennessee. FMU joined CC after 31 years in the Peach Belt Conference. The school sponsors 15 intercollegiate varsity sports; men's sports are baseball, basketball, cross country, golf, soccer, tennis, and indoor rack and field), and women's sports are basketball, cross-country, soccer, softball, tennis, indoor and outdoor track and field (counted by the NCAA as separate sports), and volleyball. The Patriot men's golf team competes in NCAA Division I as a single-sport member of the Southland Conference.

Student life
Francis Marion University fields numerous fraternities and sororities, as well as other clubs and organizations on campus.  Fraternities and sororities present on campus include:
 
Patriot Fraternity Council (PFC):
Kappa Alpha Order (Delta Tau),
Tau Kappa Epsilon (Tau Sigma),
Pi Kappa Alpha

National Panhellenic Conference (NPC):
Alpha Delta Pi (Zeta Phi),
Kappa Delta (Epsilon Psi),
Zeta Tau Alpha (Eta Chi)

National Pan-Hellenic Council (NPHC):
Alpha Phi Alpha  (Kappa Chi),
Alpha Kappa Alpha (Iota Xi),
Kappa Alpha Psi (Mu Theta),
Omega Psi Phi (Lambda Lambda),
Delta Sigma Theta (Xi Omicron),
Phi Beta Sigma  (Pi Chi),
Zeta Phi Beta (Xi Nu),
Sigma Gamma Rho (Xi),
Iota Phi Theta

Other Greek Affiliated Sororities & Fraternities :
Gamma Sigma Sigma (Eta Beta),
Lambda Tau Omega (Phonoxy Pi),
Delta Sigma Pi (Omicron Upsilon)

Non-Greek Organizations:
Patriot Marketing Club,
Young Americans for Liberty,
Gender-Sexuality Alliance,
The American Chemical Society,
Baptist Collegiate Ministries,
Intramural Council

University Presidents
The university has had four presidents to date: Dr. Walter Douglas Smith (1969 to 1983), Dr. Thomas C. Stanton (1983 to 1994), Dr. Lee A. Vickers (1994 to 1999), and Dr. Luther Fred Carter, the current president.

Notable alumni
 Bree Boyce - Miss South Carolina 2011
Kellie Rasberry - radio host of Kidd Kraddick in the Morning
 Yancey McGill - Lieutenant Governor of South Carolina
 Mark L. Walberg - Television Host
 Alan Wilson - Attorney General of South Carolina
 Pearl Moore - Former professional basketball player
 Josh Edgin - Former New York Mets pitcher
 Terry Alexander - Member of the South Carolina House of Representatives
 Patricia Moore Henegan - Member of the South Carolina House of Representatives
 Heather Ammons Crawford - Member of the South Carolina House of Representatives
 Jeff Noble - Former member of the Michigan House of Representatives
 Carl Anderson - Member of the South Carolina House of Representatives

References

External links
 Official website
 Official athletics website
 Francis Marion University Digital Collections

 
Buildings and structures in Florence, South Carolina
Universities and colleges accredited by the Southern Association of Colleges and Schools
Educational institutions established in 1970
1970 establishments in South Carolina
Public universities and colleges in South Carolina